The following events related to sociology occurred in the 1920s.

1920
Morris Ginsberg's The Psychology of Society is published.
Robert Lowie's Primitive Society is published.
György Lukács' The Theory of the Novel is published.
Walter Benjamin's Theological-Political Fragment is written.

1921
James Bryce's Modern Democracies is published.
Sigmund Freud's Group Psychology and the Analysis of the Ego is published.
Robert E. Park's and Ernest Burgess's The Science of Sociology is published.
Alfred Radcliffe-Brown's The Andaman Islanders is published.
R.H. Tawney's The Acquisitive Society is published.
Max Weber's The City is published.
Ludwig Josef Johann Wittgenstein's Tractatus Logico-Philosophicus is published.
Edward C. Hayes serves as president of the ASA.
National Council for the Social Studies is founded

1922
Lucien Lévy-Bruhl's Primitive Mentality is published.
Alexander Carr-Saunders' The Population Problem is published.
Franklin Giddings' Studies in the Theory of Human Society is published.
Leonard Trelawny Hobhouse's Elements of Social Justice is published.
Bronisław Malinowski's Argonauts of the Western Pacific is published.
Robert Park's The Immigrant Press and Its Control is published.
Ferdinand Tönnies' Kritik der öffentlichen Meinung (On Public Opinion) is published.
Max Weber's Economy and Society is published in two volumes (edited by Marianne Weber).
Max Weber's Science as a Vocation is published.
James P. Lichtenberg serves as president of the American Sociological Association.
Howard W. Odum founds the Journal of Social Forces

Births
March 18: Seymour Martin Lipset
June 11: Erving Goffman

1923
Nels Anderson's and the Council of Social Agencies of Chicago's The Hobo is published.
Victor Branford's Science and sanctity : a study in the scientific approach to unity is published.
Georg Lukács' History and Class Consciousness is published.
George Herbert Mead's Scientific Method and the Moral Sciences is published.
William F. Ogburn's Social Change With Respect to Culture and Original Nature is published.
W. I. Thomas's The Unadjusted Girl is published.
Max Weber's General Economic History is published.
Ulysses G. Weatherly serves as president of the ASA.
Founding of the Social Sciences Research Council

Deaths
August 19: Vilfredo Pareto

1924
Franklin Giddings' The Scientific Study of Human Society is published.
Leonard Trelawny Hobhouse's Social Development: Its nature and companions is published.
George Herbert Mead's The Genesis of the Self and Social Control is published.
Helmuth Plessner's Limits of Community: A Critique of Social Radiclaism is published.
Albion Small's Origins of Sociology is published.
Max Scheler's Essays Toward a Sociology of Knowledge is published.
Charles A. Ellwood serves as president of the ASA.

Births
August 10: Jean-François Lyotard

1925
Alfred Louis Kroeber's Handbook of the Indians of California is published.
Marcel Mauss' The Gift is published.
Robert Ezra Park's The City is published.
Pitirim Sorokin's The Sociology of Revolution is published.

1926
Hans Freyer's Belief, Style and The State is published.
Bronislaw Malinowski's Crime and Custom in Savage Society is published.
Max Scheler's Sociology of Knowledge is published.
R. H. Tawney's Religion and the Rise of Capitalism is published.
Ferdinand Tönnies' Property is published.

1927
Franz Boas' Primitive Art is published.
Alexander Carr-Saunders' The Social Structure of England and Wales is published.
Sigmund Freud's The Future of An Illusion is published.
Robert H. Lowie's Origins of the State is published.
Bronislaw Malinowski's Sex and Repression in Savage Society is published.
Martin Heidegger's Being and Time is published.
Pitirim Sorokin's Social Mobility is published.
William Sumner's and Andrew Kellner's The Science of Society is published.
W. I. Thomas serves as president of the ASA.

Births
December 8: Niklas Luhmann

1928
Melville Jean Herskovits' The American Negro is published.
Robert Morrison MacIver's Community is published.
Karl Mannheim's Essays on the Sociology of Knowledge is published.
Margaret Mead's Coming of Age in Samoa is published.
Max Scheler's Social Mobility is published.
Louis Wirth's The Ghetto is published.

1929
Hans Freyer's Sociology as a Science of Reality is published.
Helen Merrell Lynd's and Robert Staughton Lynd's Middletown: A study in Contemporary American Culture is published.
Bronislaw Malinowski's The Sexual Life of Savages is published.
Karl Mannheim's Ideology and Utopia is published.
Marc Bloch and Lucien Febvre found the Annales School in Strasbourg.
Morris Ginsberg take over the chair of Sociology at the LSE.

Sociology
Sociology timelines
1920s decade overviews